Joseph Robert Shoenfield (1927, Detroit – November 15, 2000, Durham, North Carolina) was an American mathematical logician.

Education
Shoenfield obtained his PhD in 1953 with Raymond Louis Wilder at the University of Michigan (Models of formal systems).

Career
From 1952, he lectured at Duke University, where he remained until becoming Emeritus in 1992. From 1970 to 1973 he was President of the Mathematics Faculty. In 1956/57 he was at the Institute for Advanced Study. Shoenfield worked on recursion theory, model theory and axiomatic set theory. His textbook on mathematical logic has become a classic.

Honors
From 1972 to 1976 he was president of the Association for Symbolic Logic. He delivered the Gödel Lecture at the 1992 meeting of the ASL.

Hobbies
Already in his student days, he was a passionate and strong contract bridge player.
He was an early member Number 694 of the American Go Association and the Memorial Tournament in North Carolina was founded in his memory. (The link includes a photograph of him.)

Selected publications 
 Mathematical Logic, Addison Wesley 1967, 2nd edition, Association for Symbolic Logic, 2001
 Degrees of unsolvability, North Holland Mathematical Studies 1971
 Recursion theory, Springer 1993

Notes

References 
 
 
 

20th-century American mathematicians
Duke University faculty
Mathematical logicians
American logicians
1927 births
2000 deaths
University of Michigan alumni
Gödel Lecturers